Sandeep Naik (born 4 August 1978) is a former member of Maharashtra Legislative Assembly (MLA). He is the son of former NCP leader, now BJP politician and former State Excise Minister and Non-Conventional Energy Minister Ganesh Naik and, younger brother of Thane NCP and NCP Chief Whip and former MP Sanjeev Naik. He rose to prominence in Maharashtra after winning the 2014 assembly elections.

Vidhan Sabha election 2009
In Maharashtra Vidhan Sabha elections of 2009, Naik won in the Airoli constituency by defeating Shiv Sena-BJP candidate.

Vidhan Sabha election 2014
All four major parties of Maharashtra (Congress, NCP, BJP, Shiv Sena) contested these elections on their own. Naik beat his nearest rival Vijay Chougule of the Shiv Sena party to retain his seat.

References

External links
 Navi Mumbai -Standing Committee chairman

1978 births
Living people
Marathi politicians
People from Navi Mumbai
Nationalist Congress Party politicians from Maharashtra
Maharashtra MLAs 2014–2019
Maharashtra MLAs 2009–2014
Bharatiya Janata Party politicians from Maharashtra